"Everybody Ought to Treat a Stranger Right" is a gospel blues song recorded in 1930 by Blind Willie Johnson with backing vocals by Willie B. Harris, who may have been his first wife. The song was released in 1930 on Columbia 14597 as B-side to "Go with Me to That Land".

The chorus consists of the lines:

The verses comment on that idea, notably with reference to the Three Wise Men offering gifts to the Christ-child in the manger.

In 2018, Ry Cooder recorded the song for his album The Prodigal Son. He commented that it was "one of Blind Willie Johnson’s great songshe’s the go to guy".

References 

Blues songs
Gospel songs
Blind Willie Johnson songs
1930 songs
Songwriter unknown